Bernard Joseph Scherer (January 28, 1913March 17, 2004) was an American football end in the National Football League. He played for the Green Bay Packers (1936–1938) and the Pittsburgh Pirates (1939). He was drafted in the third round of the 1936 NFL Draft. He was the first Nebraska Cornhuskers football player to be drafted in the NFL Draft. He later served as an officer in the United States Army, reaching the rank of colonel and serving during World War II, the Korean War, and the Vietnam War. Scherer is buried at the National Memorial Cemetery of Arizona.

External links

People from Boyd County, Nebraska
Players of American football from Nebraska
American football wide receivers
Nebraska Cornhuskers football players
Green Bay Packers players
Pittsburgh Pirates (football) players
United States Army personnel of World War II
1913 births
2004 deaths
United States Army personnel of the Korean War
United States Army personnel of the Vietnam War

https://www.legacy.com/obituaries/azcentral/obituary.aspx?n=bernard-j-scherer&pid=2083941